Briton's Lane Gravel Pit is a  geological Site of Special Scientific Interest  east of Sheringham in  Norfolk. It is a Geological Conservation Review site and it is in the Norfolk Coast Area of Outstanding Natural Beauty.

This working quarry exposes gravel and sand derived from melting ice at the end of the Anglian glaciation around 425,000 years ago.

The site is private land with no public access.

References

External links
Field Guide to the Geology of North Norfolk: 'Briton's Lane

Sites of Special Scientific Interest in Norfolk
Geological Conservation Review sites